Sierra Vista High School may refer to:

Sierra Vista High School (California), located in Baldwin Park, California
Sierra Vista High School (Nevada), located in Spring Valley, Nevada